Concordia may refer to:

 Concordia (mythology), the Roman goddess who embodies agreement in marriage and society

Businesses and organizations

Educational institutions 
 Concordia University (disambiguation), for Concordia University, Concordia College and Concordia Seminary
 Concordia Academy (disambiguation)
 Concordia High School (disambiguation)
 Concordia Lutheran High School (disambiguation)
 Concordia International School Shanghai, in Pudong, China
 Concordia Junior-Senior High School, Concordia, Kansas
 Concordia Language Villages, a world-language and culture education program
 Concordia Normal School (closed 1878)
 Great Western Business and Normal College, or Concordia Normal School and Business College, or Concordia Business College, in Concordia, Kansas, U.S. (closed 1930s)

Other businesses and organizations 
 Concordia Association of Manchukuo, a 1930s–1940s political party
 Concordia Healthcare, now Advanz Pharma
 Concordia Publishing House, LCMS publishing wing
 Concordia Summit, a nonprofit organization and annual summit

People 
 Charles Concordia (1908–2003), American electrical engineer
 Concordia Antarova (1886–1959), Russian singer
 Concordia Scott (1924–2014), Scottish sculptor and Benedictine nun
 Concordia Selander (1861–1935), Swedish actress and theatre director

Places

Africa 
 Concordia, Northern Cape, South Africa
 Concordia, Western Cape, South Africa

Antarctica 
 Concordia Station, a scientific research station 
 Concordia Subglacial Lake

Asia
 Concordia (Karakoram), a confluence of two glaciers in Pakistan

Australasia 
 Concordia, South Australia, in the Barossa Valley

Europe 
 Concordia, Ede, a windmill in the Netherlands
 Concordia Sagittaria, town and diocesan seat in north-eastern Italy, formerly the Roman city of Iulia Concordia
 Concordia sulla Secchia, Italy

Central America
 Concordia, Olancho, Honduras

North America 
 Concordia (electoral district), Manitoba, Canada
 Concordia Municipality, Sinaloa, Mexico
 Concordia, Sinaloa
 Concordia, Saint Martin

United States
 Concordia, Kansas
Camp Concordia, World War II prisoner of war camp
 Concordia, Kentucky
 Concordia Parish, Louisiana
 Concordia, Mississippi, ghost town in Bolivar County
 Concordia, Missouri
 Concordia, New Jersey
 Concordia, Portland, Oregon
 Concordia, Texas, unincorporated community, Nueces County
 Concordia, a former name of Walburg, Texas
 Concordia, Saint Croix, U.S. Virgin Islands
 Concordia, Saint John, U.S. Virgin Islands

South America 
 Concordia Bay, Falkland Islands
 Concordia Department, an administrative subdivision of Entre Ríos, Argentina
Concordia, Entre Ríos, Argentina
Concordia Airport
 Concórdia, Santa Catarina, Brazil
 Concordia, Antioquia, Colombia
 Concordia, Magdalena, Colombia
 Puerto Concordia, Colombia

Ships and boats 
 Concordia-class cruise ship
 Concordia (ship) (1992–2010), a barquentine tall ship used for sail training
 Concordia (1696 ship), an early Dutch sailing ship
 Concordia (steamboat), ran on Puget Sound 1930s–1970s
 Concordia yawl, a type of sailing boat

Sport 
 Concordia Knurów, Polish football club
 Concordia Piotrków Trybunalski, Polish football club
 CS Concordia Chiajna, Romanian football club
 FC Concordia Basel, Swiss football club, playing in the Challenge League
 FC Concordia Wilhelmsruh, German football club based in Berlin
 HŠK Concordia, Croatian football club (1906–1945)
 SC Concordia von 1907, German football club
 Stadionul Concordia, Concordia Stadium, the home grounds of CS Concordia Chiajna
 SV Concordia Königsberg, East Prussian football club (1911–1945)

Other uses
 Concordia (beverage), a Peruvian soft drink brand
 Concordia (board game), a Eurogame set in the early Roman Empire
 Cunliffe-Owen Concordia, a British 1940s airliner
 Concordia Theatre, in Hinckley, England
 58 Concordia, a main-belt asteroid 
 Book of Concord, or Concordia, the historic doctrinal standard of the Lutheran Church
 Concordia, a synonym of Euconcordia, an extinct genus of reptiles
 Concordia, alternative name of the Romanian newspaper Românul

See also 

 Concord (disambiguation)
 Concordance (disambiguation)
 Concorde (disambiguation)
 Concordia Lutheran Church (disambiguation)
 Concordian International School, in Bangkaew, Samutprakarn, Thailand